Dash-e Darageh (also Romanized as Dāsh-e Darageh) is a village in Almahdi Rural District, Mohammadyar District, Naqadeh County, West Azerbaijan Province, Iran. At the 2006 census, its population was 715, in 140 families.

References 

Populated places in Naqadeh County